is a Japanese politician of the Democratic Party, a member of the House of Councillors in the Diet, and general secretary of the ruling Democratic Party. A native of Nirasaki, Yamanashi, and graduate of Tsuru University, he was elected to the House of Representatives of Japan in 1990, where he served for two terms until 1996 when he failed to be re-elected. He was elected to the House of Councillors for the first time in 1998.

Career before politics
Koshiishi was an elementary school teacher for 26 years. He became involved in union activities through the Japan Teachers Union (Nikkyoso), becoming the chair of the executive committee of the Yamanashi branch in 1984, and Chair of the Yamanashi Trade Union Confederation in 1986. Subsequently, he became the director of the Yamanashi Prefecture Educational Research Institute in 1997.

Political career
Koshiishi was elected to the House of Representatives for the first time in 1990, representing the Social Democratic Party. He was re-elected in 1993, serving two terms as a lower-house lawmaker and participated in the formation of the predecessor to the Democratic Party of Japan, but was not re-elected in 1996.

He was elected to the House Councillors for the first time in 1998 and re-elected in 2004 and 2010. In January 2016 he announced that he would not seek a fourth term and was replaced by Democratic Party candidate  at the July 2016 election.

As DPJ General Secretary
Koshiishi became general secretary of the DPJ on August 31, 2011, the first upper house member of the party to occupy the position, and at 75 years of age, the oldest person ever to become general secretary of the party. His appointment happened as Yoshihiko Noda replaced Naoto Kan as president of the ruling DPJ and therefore prime minister of Japan. Ichiro Ozawa, former DPJ president and powerbroker, had wanted Banri Kaieda in the role of DPJ president instead of Noda. Koshiishi had close ties to Ozawa and Noda appointing him was an attempt at achieving party unity. The attempt was ultimately unsuccessful, as despite Koshiishi attempting to smooth over differences, following Noda's administration passing an increase to the consumption tax from 5% to 10% through the lower house of the diet Ozawa and dozens of lawmakers from his faction left the party in July 2012 to form People's Life First.

Koshiishi was re-appointed general secretary by Noda in September 2012. After Noda won re-election as DPJ president on September 21 he asked Koshiishi to remain in office. Koshiishi refrained from accepting the post again, but accepted it two days later, on September 23. Just as his initial appointment had been, his reappointment was another attempt to unify the party.

See also 
Japan Teachers Union

References

External links 
 Official website in Japanese.

|-

|-

|-

|-

|-

1936 births
Living people
Democratic Party of Japan politicians
Japanese educators
Japanese trade unionists
Members of the House of Councillors (Japan)
Members of the House of Representatives (Japan)
Politicians from Yamanashi Prefecture